Brenda Reid (born July 20, 1945) is an American singer, who was lead singer of the group The Exciters best known for (U.S. #4) single "Tell Him".  Brenda was married to fellow band member Herb Rooney.

Career
In 1961, Reid joined The Masterettes, consisting of Brenda Reid on lead, Sylvia Wilbur (who later married Dickie Williams), Lillian Walker, and Carol Johnson.   That group became The Exciters.  The Exciters' first hit record, produced by Jerry Leiber and Mike Stoller, was "Tell Him" (U.S. #4).  Tell Him was recorded in late 1962 and a music video of it was produced about the same time, one of the earliest Rock and Roll videos. Other hit songs with Reid's vocals included "He's Got the Power", "Get Him" and Northern Soul classic "Blowing Up My Mind". The Exciters also recorded the original version of "Do Wah Diddy Diddy" in 1963; it was covered shortly after by Manfred Mann, for whom it was an international hit.

In 1975, Reid and the Exciters enjoyed a hit single with "Reachin' for the Best", produced by Rooney and young newcomer producer Ian Levine. The song was aimed at the British Northern soul scene but crossed over to the UK Singles Chart where it peaked at No. 31.

In 1978, Reid formed a group with her husband Herb Rooney called Brenda And Herb, releasing one album in 1979, "In Heat Again".

Brenda's son (Mark) Cory Rooney is a songwriter and producer, known for creating hits for many famous artists.

See also
List of doo-wop musicians

References

External links 
 The Exciters bio

American women pop singers
Northern soul musicians
1945 births
Living people
21st-century American women